Soldiers of the Emperor (Hungarian:A Császár katonái) is a 1918 Hungarian silent film directed by Béla Balogh and starring Lya De Putti, Sándor Virányi, and Aladár Ihász.

Cast
 Lya De Putti
 Sándor Virányi 
 Aladár Ihász 
 Lajos Szóke 
 Lajos Szõke 
 Zsigmond Gere 
 István Ihász

References

Bibliography
 Bock, Hans-Michael & Bergfelder, Tim. The Concise CineGraph. Encyclopedia of German Cinema. Berghahn Books, 2009.

External links

1918 films
1910s Hungarian-language films
Hungarian silent films
Hungarian black-and-white films